Mario Bühler (born 5 January 1992) is a Swiss football defender who plays for Kriens in the Swiss Promotion League.

Club career
Bühler began his career at FC Luzern and has been with the club since 20 June 2000, when he was just eight years old.

On 27 August 2020, he signed with Cham.

On 27 May 2022, Bühler moved to Kriens.

Honours
FC Vaduz
Liechtenstein Football Cup (3): 2015-16, 2016-17, 2017-18

References

External links
football.ch profile 

1992 births
People from Hochdorf District
Living people
Swiss men's footballers
Association football defenders
Switzerland youth international footballers
FC Luzern players
FC Wohlen players
FC Vaduz players
FC Winterthur players
SC Cham players
SC Kriens players
Swiss Super League players
Swiss Challenge League players
Swiss Promotion League players
Swiss 1. Liga (football) players
Swiss expatriate footballers
Expatriate footballers in Liechtenstein
Swiss expatriate sportspeople in Liechtenstein
Sportspeople from the canton of Lucerne